Ripon is a city in North Yorkshire, England.

Ripon may also refer to:

Places

Australia
 County of Ripon, Victoria
 Electoral district of Ripon, Victoria
 Shire of Ripon, Victoria, a former local government area

Canada
 Ripon, Quebec

England
 Ripon (UK Parliament constituency)
 Liberty of Ripon, a former liberty possessing separate county jurisdiction
 Diocese of Ripon, a former Church of England diocese
 Ripon Canal, North Yorkshire

Uganda
 Ripon Falls, Uganda

United States
 Ripon, California
 Ripon, Wisconsin
 Ripon (town), Wisconsin

Schools
 Ripon College (disambiguation)
 Ripon High School (California), Ripon, California
 Ripon High School (Wisconsin), Ripon, Wisconsin
 Ripon Grammar School, Ripon, North Yorkshire, England

Military
 , several ships of the Royal Navy
 Blackburn Ripon, a British carrier-based torpedo bomber and reconnaissance biplane which first flew in 1926
 RAF Ripon, also known as Royal Flying Corps Ripon, a First World War airfield

Transportation
 PS Ripon, a 19th-century paddlesteamer
 , a 20th-century merchant ship
 Ripon railway station, Ripon, North Yorkshire, a former station
 Ripon station, a future railway station in Ripon, California

Other uses
 Marquess of Ripon and Earl of Ripon, extinct titles in the Peerage of the United Kingdom
 Baron Ripon, a subsidiary title held only by the second Duke of Queensberry
 Ripon Building, a building in Chennai
 Ripon Cricket Club, Ripon, North Yorkshire
 Ripon Nath, 21st century Bangladeshi movie audio engineer

See also
 
 Ripon Society, a centrist Republican think tank
 Ecgberht of Ripon (died 729), Anglo-Saxon monk and Bishop of Lindisfarne
 Stephen of Ripon, author of the eighth-century hagiographic text Vita Sancti Wilfrithi (Life of Saint Wilfrid)
 Rippon (disambiguation)